Ernst Hack (16 December 1946 in Ternberg – 1 June 1986 in Gramastetten) was an Austrian wrestler who competed in the 1972 Summer Olympics.

References

External links
 

1946 births
1986 deaths
Olympic wrestlers of Austria
Wrestlers at the 1972 Summer Olympics
Austrian male sport wrestlers